The equipment of the Royal Malaysian Air Force can be subdivided into: aircraft, munition, tactical decoy, pod, radar, air defense and firearm.

Aircraft

Munition

Tactical decoy

Pod

Radar

Air defense

Firearm

See also
 List of equipment of the Malaysian Army
 List of equipment of the Royal Malaysian Navy
 List of aircraft of the Malaysian Armed Forces
 List of equipment of the Malaysian Maritime Enforcement Agency
 List of vehicles of the Royal Malaysian Police
 List of police firearms in Malaysia

References

 
Royal Malaysian Air Force
Malaysian Air Force